Liberton/Gilmerton is one of the seventeen wards used to elect members of the City of Edinburgh Council. Established in 2007 along with the other wards, it elects four Councillors.

As its name suggests, the ward's territory is based around the communities of Gilmerton and Liberton in the far south-east of the city's urban area up to the boundary with Midlothian, also including Alnwickhill, Burdiehouse, Craigour, Ferniehill, Fernieside, Gracemount, The Inch, Kaimes, Moredun, Mortonhall and Southhouse, forming a suburban cluster that is almost physically separate from the rest of Edinburgh. A minor 2017 boundary change in the north of the ward saw the loss of Nether Liberton village, the Cameron Toll Shopping Centre and Inch Park, but the overall population increased slightly due to housebuilding in several other areas (Heritage Grange, The Limes, Manor Wood, South Gilmerton Brae, etc.). In 2019, the ward had a population of 35,480.

Councillors

Elections

2022 election
The 2022 City of Edinburgh Council election was held on 5 May 2022.

†Incumbent councillor for Colinton/Fairmilehead.

2017 election
2017 City of Edinburgh Council election

On 30 July 2020, councillor Derek Howie resigned from the SNP Group to become an Independent.

2013 by-election
SNP councillor Tom Buchanan died on 3 April 2013. The by-election was held on 20 June 2013 and was won by Labour's Keith John Robson.

2012 election
2012 City of Edinburgh Council election

2010 by-election
A by-election arose following the resignation of Ian Murray after his election as an MP on 6 May 2010. The seat was held by Labour's Bill Cook on 9 September 2010.

2007 election
2007 City of Edinburgh Council election

References

External links
Listed Buildings in Liberton/Gilmerton Ward, City of Edinburgh at British Listed Buildings

Wards of Edinburgh